Pemba is a small town (population about 4,000) located in Pemba District of the Southern Province of Zambia.  It is situated on the Lusaka–Livingstone Road that runs between Lusaka and Livingstone. The main ethnic group in the town are the Tonga. Prominent educational institutions found here are Pemba Basic School, Pemba High School, Jembo Mission High School and Kasiya Secretarial College.

Pemba was declared a district by the head of state Michael Chilufya Sata in 2012. Before that, it was part of Choma District.

Pemba is the exact midway when travelling from Livingstone to Lusaka.

Pemba also hosts the Zambia National Broadcasting Corporation (ZNBC) television transmitter station for the Southern Province.

References

Populated places in Southern Province, Zambia